Plurinational Unity of the Lefts (Unidad Plurinacional de las Izquierdas) is a left-wing political coalition in Ecuador, created in 2011.

History
In 2009, Pachakutik and the Democratic People's Movement (MPD) broke with the ruling PAIS Alliance over disagreements on water law and teacher evaluations. In the National Assembly, a new caucus formed called the Plurinational, Progressive, and Leftist Democratic Assembly, composed of Pachakutik and MPD assemblymen and assemblywomen.

2011 Referendum
Plurinational Unity of the Lefts participated in the referendum and popular consultation of 2011, advising a "no" vote on questions 1-9, and "yes" on 10. They used the slogan "Not this time, President" recognizing their past support of President Correa's proposals, but conveying their support was over.

Prostests of 2012

Beginning on 8 March 2012, Plurinational Unity of the Lefts participated in a series of peaceful protests, commonly called the 8-M Movement, by indigenous groups, left-wing opponents of the government, environmental groups, LGBT groups, and students, which culminated in the arrival of more than 30,000 people in the streets of Ecuador.

Participating Parties
The coalition currently comprises the following ten parties (in alphabetical order):
Democratic People's Movement
Ethics and Democracy Network
Marxist–Leninist Communist Party of Ecuador
Montecristi Lives
Movement Convocation
Pachakutik Plurinational Unity Movement – New Country
Participation Movement
Party of Revolutionary Socialism
Participa Movement Radical Democracy
Popular Power

Electoral Results

National Assembly

Presidential

See also
PAIS Alliance

 
Anti-capitalist political parties
Far-left political parties
Left-wing parties
Socialism in Ecuador
2011 establishments in Ecuador